5535 Annefrank, provisional designation , is a stony Florian asteroid and suspected contact binary from the inner asteroid belt, approximately 4.5 kilometers in diameter. It was used as a target to practice the flyby technique that the Stardust space probe would later use on the comet Wild 2.

The asteroid was discovered 23 March 1942, by German astronomer Karl Reinmuth at Heidelberg Observatory in southwest Germany.  It was named after Anne Frank, a victim of the Holocaust.

Orbit and classification 

Annefrank is a member of the Flora family, one of the largest collisional populations of stony asteroids in the main-belt. It orbits the Sun in the inner main-belt at a distance of 2.1–2.4 AU once every 3 years and 3 months (1,202 days). Its orbit has an eccentricity of 0.06 and an inclination of 4° with respect to the ecliptic.

Physical characteristics 

Annefrank has been characterized as a common S-type asteroid.

Diameter, albedo and shape 

On 2 November 2002, the Stardust space probe flew past Annefrank at a distance of 3079 km. Its images show the asteroid to be 6.6 × 5.0 × 3.4 km, twice as big as previously thought, and its main body shaped like a triangular prism with several visible impact craters. From the photographs, the albedo of Annefrank was computed to be between 0.18 and 0.24. Preliminary analysis of the Stardust imagery suggests that Annefrank may be a contact binary, although other possible explanations exist for its observed shape.

Rotation and poles 

In October 2006, ground-based photometric observations were used in an attempt to measure Annefranks rotational period. Analysis of the ambiguous lightcurve gave a period of  hours and a brightness variation of 0.25 magnitude with two alternative period solutions of 12 and 22.8 hours, respectively.

The lightcurve data suggests that Annefrank is not Lambertian, meaning that surface features, such as shadows from boulders and craters, play a role in the object's perceived brightness and not just the asteroid's relative size when seen from that orientation.

The body's shortest axis is approximately aligned perpendicular to its orbital plane.

Naming 

This minor planet was named after Anne Frank, the Dutch-Jewish diarist who died in a Nazi concentration camp (World War II). The official naming citation was published by the Minor Planet Center on 14 May 1995.

References

External links 

 A page with images from the Stardust flyby 
 Ted Stryk's Stardust page, including enhanced images of 5535 Annefrank
 Asteroid Lightcurve Database (LCDB), query form (info )
 Dictionary of Minor Planet Names, Google books
 Asteroids and comets rotation curves, CdR – Observatoire de Genève, Raoul Behrend
 Discovery Circumstances: Numbered Minor Planets (5001)-(10000) – Minor Planet Center
 

005535
Discoveries by Karl Wilhelm Reinmuth
Named minor planets
20021102
Anne Frank
005535
19420323